The UAAP Season 80 Men's Football Final took place on 3 May 2017 at the Rizal Memorial Stadium. It will be the final match of the UAAP Season 80. It was contested between the UP Fighting Maroons and the UST Growling Tigers. UP won 1-0, with Ian Clarino's 21st minute goal to claim their eighteenth UAAP Football Championship title.

Route to the Final
The Final Four of the tournament are #1 seed Ateneo Blue Eagles, #2 UP Fighting Maroons, #3 FEU Tamaraws, and #4 UST Growling Tigers who just finished from the Elimination Round. UP coming from the season undefeated with 10 wins and 4 draws defeated 4th seed De La Salle, 1 - 0. The goal coming from a confusion with the La Salle defenders clearing the ball ended up with Kyle Magdato who easily converted a few feet from the spot kick area. This proves to be the needed goal for UP to advance to the final. UP overpowered La Salle 13 shots, with 6 on goal, against 4 shots.

On the other side of the draw, third seed UST Growling Tigers upsets second seed and reigning champs Ateneo Blue Eagles, 1 - 0, which needed extra time going scoreless draw after 90 minutes. The lead up came from a corner kick by Austin Alianza in the 105th minute, initially cleared by Ateneo's Goalkeeper Alex Arcilla ended up with a UST player. Scramble ensues as Ateneo tried to clear the ball, however UST's Conrado Dimacali stood tall as the substitute headed the ball into the Ateneo net. UST avenges their season 79 defeat from Ateneo and heads to their first UAAP Men's Football finals since season 74 meeting, coincidentally against the same team, UP.

Team standings

Playoffs

Semifinals

Match
The two teams last met in the Finals on UAAP Season 74 and UAAP Season 73 both going on the side of the Maroons. UST led by OJ Clarino, UP's Ian Clarino's older brother, suffered consecutive defeats in the finals against a stacked UP lineup then led by Jinggoy Valmayor, Ayii Nii, and Nathan Octavio. 

With a cruel twist of fate, it was Ian Clarino who kept UST from tasting their first championship since Season 69. Coming from a set piece delivered by JB Borlongan a few yards from the penalty area, Ian Clarino was kept onside by a UST defender and left alone against this season's UAAP Best Keeper Zaldy Abraham. Clarino, who was named UAAP's Most Valuable Player, easily volleyed the ball straight to the net on the 21st minute. This proves to be the difference as the championship goes to the other side of Katipunan for the 2nd time in 3 years, giving UP its 18th UAAP Football Crown.

Details

Match rules
90 minutes.
30 minutes of extra-time if necessary.
Penalty shoot-out if scores still level.
Seven named substitutes.
Maximum of three substitutions.

Broadcasting
The match was broadcast live on ABS-CBN Sports+Action for regular channel and ABS-CBN Sports+Action HD via livestream and Cable TV.The match commentators are Bob Guerrero and Miguel Carrion.

Men's football final